Thomas J. Kelly is an American cancer researcher whose work focuses on the molecular mechanisms of DNA replication. Kelly is  director of the Sloan-Kettering Institute, the basic research arm of the Memorial Sloan-Kettering Cancer Center. He holds the Center's Benno C. Schmidt Chair of Cancer Research.

Before joining Sloan-Kettering in 2002, Kelly was professor and director of the Department of Molecular Biology  and Genetics at the Johns Hopkins University School of Medicine and was the founding director of the Johns Hopkins Institute for Basic Biomedical Sciences.

Kelly pioneered the study of DNA replication in eukaryotic cells by using DNA viruses as model systems.  His laboratory developed the first cell-free systems for studying the biochemistry of DNA replication in human cells, enabling the identification and functional characterization of components of the human replication machinery.

In recognition of this work he received the 2004 Alfred P. Sloan, Jr. Prize of the General Motors Cancer Research Foundation and the 2010 Louisa Gross Horwitz Prize of Columbia University.

Career
Kelly earned a Ph.D. in biophysics in 1968 and an M.D. in 1969. While a postdoctoral fellow with Hamilton O. Smith at the Johns Hopkins University School of Medicine during 1969-70,  Kelly determined the DNA sequences recognized by type II restriction enzymes, which subsequently became major tools in recombinant DNA research. In 1970 he moved to the National Institutes of Health as a member of the United States Public Health Service and conducted research on the DNA viruses, adenovirus and SV40, which cause tumors in animals. He joined the faculty in the Department of Microbiology at the Johns Hopkins University School of Medicine in 1972, where he began to exploit viruses as potentially powerful model systems for exploring the mechanisms of DNA replication in human cells.

Using proteins derived from human cells, he and his colleagues developed the first cell-free DNA replication systems capable of duplicating the complete genomes of adenovirus and SV40. The SV40 system proved to be a particularly useful system because SV40 relies largely on the cellular replication machinery for the duplication of its genome. Thus, biochemical analysis of the SV40 system made it possible to identify and functionally characterize proteins and enzymes that carry out the duplication of the chromosomal DNA in human cells. In subsequent work Kelly and colleagues have shifted their focus from studying the machinery of DNA replication to the mechanism that controls it.  Studying these mechanisms are essential for ensuring the accuracy of DNA replication during the cell cycle in human cells and in fission yeast (Schizosaccharomyces pombe), which is highly significant in understanding cancer.

Since 2002, Kelly has been the director of the Sloan-Kettering Institute, where he has expanded or re-invigorated some of its laboratory research programs. Kelly also led the establishment of the Gerstner Sloan-Kettering Graduate School of Biomedical Sciences, which provides a novel curriculum in basic and translational cancer biology leading to the Ph.D. degree.

Honors 
 Member, Institute of Medicine
 Member, National Academy of Sciences
 Member, American Philosophical Society
 Fellow, American Academy of Arts and Sciences
 Fellow, American Association for the Advancement of Science
 Fellow, American Academy of Microbiology
 Member, Johns Hopkins Society of Scholars

Awards
 Louisa Gross Horwitz Prize of Columbia University, 2010
 Alfred P. Sloan, Jr. Prize of the General Motors Cancer Research Foundation, 2004

References

External links
Geoffrey Beene Docs Retrieved on March 5, 2013
Publications on Pubmed
Memorial Sloan-Kettering Cancer Center Lab page
New York Genome Center Launches Innovation Center August 1, 2012
Interview with Thomas Kelly

Living people
21st-century American biologists
Fellows of the American Academy of Arts and Sciences
Members of the United States National Academy of Sciences
Members of the National Academy of Medicine
Cancer researchers
Members of the American Philosophical Society
1941 births